Wings is the sixth studio album by American country music artist Mark Chesnutt, and his second for Decca Records. Released in late 1995, it features the singles "Trouble", "It Wouldn't Hurt to Have Wings", and "Wrong Place, Wrong Time". Respectively, these reached #18, #7, and #37 on the Billboard Hot Country Songs charts. Unlike Chesnutt's first five albums, which were produced by Mark Wright, Wings was produced by Tony Brown. This was the first album of Chesnutt's career not to achieve RIAA certification.

"The King of Broken Hearts" was previously recorded by George Strait on the soundtrack of the 1992 film Pure Country, and was later covered by Lee Ann Womack on her 2008 album Call Me Crazy. "Trouble" was originally recorded by Todd Snider on his 1994 debut album Songs for the Daily Planet.

Track listing

Personnel
 Larry Byrom – electric guitar
 Mark Chesnutt – lead vocals 
 Paul Franklin – steel guitar
 Rob Hajacos – fiddle
 Terry McMillan – harmonica, percussion
 Liana Manis – background vocals
 Brent Mason – electric guitar, tic tac bass
 Steve Nathan – piano, keyboards, synthesizer, Hammond B-3 organ
 John Wesley Ryles – background vocals
 Harry Stinson – background vocals
 Billy Joe Walker, Jr. – electric guitar, acoustic guitar
 Biff Watson – acoustic guitar
 Lonnie Wilson – drums
 Glenn Worf – bass guitar

Chart performance

References

 

1995 albums
Albums produced by Tony Brown (record producer)
Mark Chesnutt albums
Decca Records albums